Runwati is Town of the Ghotki District in Ubauro Taluka

References

Cities and towns in Ghotki District
Towns in Pakistan